McMullen County is a county located in the U.S. state of Texas. As of the 2020 census, its population was 600, making it the fourth-least populous county in Texas. Its county seat is Tilden. The county was established from parts of Bexar County, Atascosa County, and Live Oak County in 1858 and later organized in 1877. It is named for John McMullen, founder of a colony in Texas. The McMullen County Courthouse was designed by the architect W.C. Stephenson, originally from Buffalo, New York. Stephenson also designed some 50 buildings in Beeville, including the Bee County Courthouse.

Geography

Major highways
  State Highway 16
  State Highway 72
  State Highway 97
  Farm to Market Road 99
  Farm to Market Road 624
  Farm to Market Road 791
  Farm to Market Road 1582

Adjacent counties
 Atascosa County (north)
 Live Oak County (east)
 Duval County (south)
 La Salle County (west)
 Frio County (northwest)

Demographics

Note: the US Census treats Hispanic/Latino as an ethnic category. This table excludes Latinos from the racial categories and assigns them to a separate category. Hispanics/Latinos can be of any race.

As of the census of 2000, there were 851 people, 355 households, and 238 families residing in the county.  The population density was less than 1/km2 (1/sq mi).  There were 587 housing units at an average density of 0 per square mile (0/km2).  The racial makeup of the county was 88.37% White, 1.18% Black or African American, 0.24% Native American, 8.93% from other races, and 1.29% from two or more races.  33.14% of the population were Hispanic or Latino of any race.

There were 355 households, out of which 25.90% had children under the age of 18 living with them, 59.70% were married couples living together, 5.60% had a female householder with no husband present, and 32.70% were non-families. 30.70% of all households were made up of individuals, and 14.90% had someone living alone who was 65 years of age or older.  The average household size was 2.40 and the average family size was 3.01.

In the county, the population was spread out, with 23.40% under the age of 18, 6.30% from 18 to 24, 23.70% from 25 to 44, 28.70% from 45 to 64, and 17.90% who were 65 years of age or older.  The median age was 43 years. For every 100 females there were 101.20 males.  For every 100 females age 18 and over, there were 105.70 males.

The median income for a household in the county was $32,500, and the median income for a family was $35,417. Males had a median income of $26,953 versus $20,982 for females. The per capita income for the county was $22,258.  20.70% of the population and 15.90% of families were below the poverty line.  Out of the total people living in poverty, 28.60% are under the age of 18 and 17.90% are 65 or older.

Education
McMullen County is served by the McMullen County Independent School District.

Coastal Bend College (formerly Bee County College) is the designated community college for the county.

Communities 
 Calliham
 Tilden (county seat)

Politics
McMullen County is heavily Republican, having only voted for a Democratic candidate once since 1952, when in 1964 Texas native Lyndon B. Johnson won in a national landslide against Republican Barry Goldwater. In 2016 Donald Trump won 91.0% of the vote in McMullen County, the most lopsided result in the county since Franklin D. Roosevelt's victory in 1932.

See also

 List of museums in South Texas
 National Register of Historic Places listings in McMullen County, Texas
 Recorded Texas Historic Landmarks in McMullen County

References

External links
 
 "McMullen County Profile" from the Texas Association of Counties

 
1877 establishments in Texas
Populated places established in 1877